Eduardo Acevedo (born 1959) is a retired Uruguayan footballer.

Eduardo Acevedo may refer to:
 Eduardo Acevedo Maturana (1815–1863), Uruguayan jurist and politician
 Eduardo Acevedo Díaz (1851–1921), Uruguayan journalist and politician
 Eduardo Acevedo (Guatemalan footballer) (born 1964), Guatemalan football player and manager
 Edward Acevedo Cruz (born 1985), Dominican Republic football player
 Eduardo Blanco Acevedo (1884–1971), Uruguayan political figure and physician